Bernard Reynès (born 18 October 1953 in Meknes, Morocco) is a member of the National Assembly of France. He represented Bouches-du-Rhône's 15th constituency  and is a member of the Republicans.

He lost his seat in the first round of the 2022 French legislative election.

References

1953 births
Living people
People from Meknes
Rally for the Republic politicians
Union for a Popular Movement politicians
The Republicans (France) politicians
The Popular Right
Deputies of the 13th National Assembly of the French Fifth Republic
Deputies of the 14th National Assembly of the French Fifth Republic
Deputies of the 15th National Assembly of the French Fifth Republic
Members of Parliament for Bouches-du-Rhône
French dentists